Lawrence J. Simon (June 28, 1933 – September 1, 1994), better known by the ring name, Boris Malenko, was an American professional wrestler and professional wrestling trainer. He is best known for his appearances with Championship Wrestling from Florida and Big Time Wrestling in the 1960s and 1970s as a Russian heel. He was the father of professional wrestlers Joe Malenko and Dean Malenko.

Early life
Simon was born in Newark, New Jersey and raised in Irvington, New Jersey. As a teenager, Simon competed at amateur wrestling in YMCAs. Before becoming a professional wrestler, he worked as a truck driver in the Garment District in New York City.

Professional wrestling career
Simon made his professional debut in 1955 as "Larry Simon", wrestling in the Eastern United States. In 1957, he joined the Dallas, Texas-based promotion Big Time Wrestling under the ring name "Crusher Duggan", winning the NWA Texas Heavyweight Championship later that year.

On July 19, 1961, Simon unsuccessfully challenged Buddy Rogers for the NWA World Heavyweight Championship in Jacksonville, Florida.

In September 1961, Simon joined in the Minneapolis, Minnesota-based American Wrestling Association. He adopted the persona of "Otto Von Krupp", a German wrestler who wore jackboots and a swastika on his back. Simon formed a tag team with Bob Geigel, with the duo winning the AWA World Tag Team Championship in November 1961, holding it until Simon left the promotion in January 1962.

In 1962, playing upon Cold War tensions, Simon adopted the persona of "Boris Malenko", an agent of the Soviet Union. He was occasionally billed as "The Great Malenko"; a pun, with "Malenko" being Russian for "little", or as "Dr. Malenko" or "Professor Malenko". He built his career in South Florida, where his gimmick made him a hated heel among the Cuban population. Over the next decade, he held the NWA Florida Heavyweight Championship twice, the NWA Florida Tag Team Championship twice, the NWA Southern Heavyweight Championship (Florida version) once, the NWA Southern Tag Team Championship (Florida version) once, and the NWA Brass Knuckles Championship (Florida version) eight times. His main rivals included Eddie Graham, Wahoo McDaniel, Johnny Valentine, Joe Scarpa, and José Lothario. In an angle in 1966, after Malenko bloodied Sammy Steamboat by biting his ear, Eddie Graham stormed the ring and punched Malenko's dentures out of his mouth, then crushed them.

In 1970, Malenko returned to Big Time Wrestling, where he held the NWA American Heavyweight Championship and the NWA Texas Tag Team Championship. He had a heated feud with Wahoo McDaniel, with McDaniel defeating him in a hair versus hair match in July 1970. A bout between the two in the Astrodome set a longstanding attendance record. In December 1970, McDaniel defeated Malenko in a loser leaves town match, marking his departure from the promotion. During his time with Big Time Wrestling he was managed by Lord Charles Montegue.

On May 9, 1972, Malenko and Bob Roop defeated Bearcat Wright and Bobby Shane to win the NWA Florida Tag Team Championship, and six days later, Malenko defeated Wright in singles competition to win his eighth and final Florida Brass Knuckles title in Orlando. On June 24, 1972, Malenko and Johnny Weaver defeated Mike Webster and The Professional for his second run with the Florida Tag Team titles.

Malenko toured Japan with All Japan Pro Wrestling in 1973 and New Japan Pro-Wrestling in 1974. During his time with NJPW, Malenko wrestled a number of high-profile bouts with Antonio Inoki.

In the late 1970s, Malenko wrestled for the Knoxville, Tennessee-based promotion Southeastern Championship Wrestling, winning both the NWA Southeastern Heavyweight Championship (Northern Division) and the NWA Southeastern Television Championship in 1978. He became the manager of Jerry Blackwell after it was claimed he had acquired the mortgage to Blackwell's family farm, forcing him to fight on his behalf. The angle ended after Ron Garvin paid off the mortgage, freeing Blackwell to attack Malenko.

Malenko retired in 1980 and opened a training school in Florida with his sons Dean and Joe.

Wrestlers trained
 Dean Malenko
 Joe Malenko
 Kane 
 Tugboat               
 Al Perez
 Norman Smiley
 Gangrel
 Barry Horowitz
 X-Pac
 Bobby Blaze
 Bob Orton Jr.
 Buddy Landel 
 Chris Champion
 Eddie Sharkey
 Horace Hogan
 Marc Mero
 Perry Saturn
 Van Hammer  
 Carl Malenko      
 Bob Cook
 Frank Reyes
 Debbie Malenko

Personal life 
Simon, who was Jewish, had two sons, Dean and Jody, both of whom became professional wrestlers. He died in September 1994 from leukemia.

Championships and accomplishments
All-Star Wrestling Omaha
Nebraska Heavyweight Championship (1 time)
American Wrestling Association
AWA World Tag Team Championship (1 time) - with Bob Geigel
Championship Wrestling from Florida
NWA Brass Knuckles Championship (Florida version) (8 times)
NWA Florida Heavyweight Championship (1 time)
NWA Florida Tag Team Championship (2 times) - with Bob Roop (1 time) and Johnny Walker (1 time)
NWA Southern Heavyweight Championship (Florida version) (1 time)
NWA Southern Tag Team Championship (Florida version) (1 time) -  with Johnny Valentine
George Tragos/Lou Thesz Professional Wrestling Hall of Fame
Trainers Award (2023)
National Wrestling Alliance
NWA Hall of Fame (Class of 2016)
NWA Big Time Wrestling
NWA American Heavyweight Championship (1 time)
NWA Texas Heavyweight Championship (1 time)
NWA Texas Tag Team Championship (1 time) - with Killer Karl Kox
Southeastern Championship Wrestling
NWA Southeastern Heavyweight Championship (Northern Division) (1 time)
NWA Southeastern Television Championship (1 time)
WWE
WWE Hall of Fame (Class of 2018)

Luchas de Apuestas record

See also
 List of Jewish professional wrestlers

References

External links
 
 

1933 births
1994 deaths
20th-century American male actors
American male professional wrestlers
Deaths from leukemia
Faux German professional wrestlers
Faux Russian professional wrestlers
Jewish American sportspeople
Jewish professional wrestlers
People from Irvington, New Jersey
Professional wrestlers from New Jersey
Professional wrestling promoters
Professional wrestling trainers
Sportspeople from Newark, New Jersey
WWE Hall of Fame Legacy inductees
20th-century American Jews
20th-century professional wrestlers
AWA World Tag Team Champions
NWA Florida Heavyweight Champions
NWA Florida Tag Team Champions
NWA Southern Heavyweight Champions (Florida version)
NWA Brass Knuckles Champions (Florida version)
NWA World Tag Team Champions (Florida version)